Transport from Paradise is a 1962 Czech drama film directed by Zbyněk Brynych. The film won the Golden Leopard at the Locarno International Film Festival.

Cast
 Zdeněk Štěpánek as Council of Elders leader David Löwenbach
 Ilja Prachař as Obersturmführer SA Moritz Herz
 Ladislav Pešek as Prisoner Hynek Roubíček
 Jindřich Narenta as SS general Josef Knecht
 Vlastimil Brodský as Servant
 Čestmír Řanda as Ignatz Marmulstaub
 Jiří Vršťala as Driver Binde
 Jaroslav Raušer as Camp commander von Holler
 Valtr Taub as Prisoner Joachim Spiegel
 Martin Gregor as Cabaretier Kurt Gerron
 Josef Abrhám as Datel
 Josef Vinklář as Vágus
 Jiřina Štěpničková as Prisoner Elisabeth Feinerová
 Juraj Herz as Mylord

Release
It was released on DVD in the UK in March 2014.

References

External links
 

1960s Czech-language films
Golden Leopard winners
1962 films
1962 drama films
Czech war drama films
1963 drama films
1963 films
1960s war drama films
Czech World War II films
Czechoslovak World War II films
1960s Czech films